Astra 1F  is one of the Astra communications satellites in geostationary orbit owned and operated by SES. It was launched in April 1996 to the Astra 19.2°E orbital slot initially to provide digital television and radio for direct-to-home (DTH) across Europe.

The satellite originally provided two broadcast beams, of horizontal and vertical polarisation, for Fixed Service Satellite (FSS) (10.70-10.95 GHz) and for Broadcast Satellite Service (BSS) (11.70-12.10 GHz) frequency bands. The FSS beams provide footprints that cover essentially the same area of Europe – northern, central and eastern Europe, including Spain and northern Italy – while the BSS horizontal beam excludes Spain and extends further east, and the BSS vertical beam includes Spain and more of southern Italy but does not extend so far east. Within the footprints, television signals are usually received with a 60–80 cm dish.

See also 

 Astra satellite family
 SES satellite operator
 SES Broadband Internet service

References

External links 
 SES guide to receiving Astra satellites
 SES guide to channels broadcasting on Astra satellites 
 OnAstra - Official consumers/viewers' site
 SES - Official trade/industry site
 SES Broadband website

Astra satellites
Communications satellites in geostationary orbit
Satellites using the BSS-601 bus
Satellite Internet access
Spacecraft launched in 1996
1996 in Luxembourg
Satellites of Luxembourg